Venus in India, or Love adventures in Hindustan is a pornographic novel by the pseudonymous "Charles Devereaux" (variously spelled in the different editions) published by Auguste Brancart in Brussels in 1889. It purports to be the autobiography of a British Army officer serving on the North West Frontier of India, describing his erotic adventures with Lizzie Wilson and the three daughters of Colonel Selwyn. His wife Louie remains in England. He sometimes refers to Théophile Gautier's Mademoiselle de Maupin during the narrative which is set during the third Afghan War. It is divided into two volumes and the content of a third volume is occasionally referred to in the text but this was never published.

References
 Hyam, Ronald (1990) Empire and Sexuality: the British experience (Studies in Imperialism), Manchester University Press ; p. 135
 Jarman, Francis (2005) White Skin, Dark Skin, Power, Dream: collected essays on literature and culture (I. O. Evans Studies in the Philosophy and Criticism of Literature; vol. 27.) Holicong, Pa.: Borgo Press  , p. 25
 İrvin Cemil Schick (1999) The Erotic Margin: sexuality and spatiality in alteritist discourse. London: Verso ; pp. 117–18

Further reading
 Devereaux, Captain C. (1983) Venus in India, or Love Adventures in Hindustan.  New York:  Warner Books (adapted edition, with an introduction by Mario Sartori)
 Devereaux, Charles (1969) Venus in India. London: Sphere Books (with an introduction by Ronald Pearsall) 
 Devereaux, Charles (1914) Vénus dans l'Inde: ou, aventures d'amour dans l'Hindoustan; par le Capt. C. Dévereaux; première traduction complète en français par un Paria de Pondichéry. Bombay

Pornographic novels
British erotic novels
1889 British novels
Works published under a pseudonym
Novels set in India